Upton (strictly the Upton Division of West Ham) was a parliamentary constituency in the Borough of West Ham in the South-West of Essex (now East London), which returned one Member of Parliament (MP) to the House of Commons of the Parliament of the United Kingdom, elected by the first past the post voting system.

The constituency was created for the 1918 general election and abolished for the 1950 general election.

Boundaries 
The County Borough of West Ham wards of Park, Upton, and West Ham.

Members of Parliament

Elections

Elections in the 1910s

Elections in the 1920s

Elections in the 1930s 

General Election 1939–40

Another General Election was required to take place before the end of 1940. The political parties had been making preparations for an election to take place and by the Autumn of 1939, the following candidates had been selected; 
Labour: D. Robert Rees
Conservative: 
British Union: Arthur Beaven

Elections in the 1940s

References

Bibliography

Parliamentary constituencies in London (historic)
Constituencies of the Parliament of the United Kingdom established in 1918
Constituencies of the Parliament of the United Kingdom disestablished in 1950
History of the London Borough of Newham
Politics of the London Borough of Newham